"The Pines" is a historic home and related dependencies located at Lyons Falls in Lewis County, New York. The main house was built about 1860 and is a timber-frame, flat-roofed, vernacular Italianate style residence.  It consists of a two-story, five-bay main block with 2 two-story wings.  Also on the property are a maple sap boiling house / woodshed (c. 1930); carriage house / garage (c. 1880); main barn (c. 1890); woodshed (ca. 1890); and workshop / shed (c. 1910).

It was listed on the National Register of Historic Places in 2007.

References

Houses on the National Register of Historic Places in New York (state)
Italianate architecture in New York (state)
Houses completed in 1860
Houses in Lewis County, New York
National Register of Historic Places in Lewis County, New York